This article lists the complete results of the knockout stage of the 2012 Thomas Cup in Wuhan, China. All times are China Standard Time (UTC+08:00).

Bracket

Quarterfinals

Japan vs. Indonesia

Russia vs. Denmark

China vs. Malaysia

Germany vs. Korea

Semifinals

Denmark vs South Korea

China vs Japan

Final

References

Thomas Cup knockout stage